Yeonsan or Yŏnsan may refer to:
Yeonsangun of Joseon (1476–1506), Joseon king
Prince Yeonsan (film), a 1961 South Korean film directed by Shin Sang-ok
Yonsan County, a county in North Hwanghae Province, North Korea
Yeonsan-myeon, a township of Nonsan, South Chungcheong Province, South Korea
Yeonsan County, the former county in Chungcheong Province, Korea to 1914

See also
Yeonsan Station (disambiguation)